FIG Script is a typeface designed by Eric Olson in 2002 for Process Type Foundry. 

The name FIG is an acronym for "Frank (Sheeran), Ian (Chai), and Glenn (Chappell) who collaborated in the development of the FIGlet computer program developed to generates text banners, in a variety of typefaces, composed of letters made up of arrangements of smaller ASCII characters. Olson used FIGlet in creating his ASCII-based FIG typefaces. Olson describes the FIG types as an "exploration into the generative possibilities type design software and simple grid structures." While suggestion of a raster is clearly visible in the face, a hominess similar to that found in nineteenth century cross-stitched samplers is also found. Many characters have swashes, and the overall effect is reminiscent of cursive.

See also

Samples of display typefaces

References
 eye. 62/06, Winter 2006. "Practice and Process: Eric Olson." By Deborah Littlejohn, pages 21–24.

External links
Process Type Foundry's web page on FIG typefaces

Script typefaces
Display typefaces
Typefaces and fonts introduced in 2002
Typefaces designed by Eric Olson